Luigi Valentino Brugnatelli (also Luigi Gaspare Brugnatelli or Luigi Vincenzo Brugnatelli) (14 February 1761 in Pavia – 24 October 1818 in Pavia) was an Italian chemist and inventor who discovered the process for electroplating in 1805.

Early life
Born in Pavia, he attended the Pharmacy School created by Count Karl Joseph von Firmian at the University of Pavia where he was a pupil of Giovanni Antonio Scopoli who urged him to practice the medical profession, which he did without neglecting his interests in chemistry.  Brugnatelli graduated in medicine in 1784 with a thesis on the chemical analysis of gastric juices. He was also a pupil of Lazzaro Spallanzani.

Academic career and discoveries

He occasionally taught at the University of Pavia where he became the head of chemistry teaching in 1796. In 1813 he became its Rector.

In 1798 Brugnatelli discovered the silver salt fulminic acid when he found that if silver was dissolved in nitric acid and the solution added to spirits of wine, a white, highly explosive powder was obtained. Decades later in 1860 this silver fulminate was used by the confectioner Tom Smith to give the 'snap' to his new novelty - the Christmas cracker. A personal friend of Alessandro Volta, Brugnatelli accompanied him to Paris in 1801 to illustrate the invention of the voltaic pile.

In 1802 Brugnatelli successfully carried out the first gilding electroplating experiments with the coating of carbon electrodes by a metallic film, finally refining the process in 1805 for which he used his colleague Volta's invention of five years earlier, the voltaic pile, to facilitate the first electrodeposition. He hypothesized that in the chemical pile there was also a transport of atoms, obtaining experimental evidence of this. He discovered the properties of coal cathodes as electrical conductors and succeeded in covering them with a metallic layer. He sensed the possible applications in the industrial field, sharing this procedure with a Pavese goldsmith, who used it.

Brugnatelli's inventions were suppressed by the French Academy of Sciences and did not become used in general industry for the following thirty years. By 1839, scientists in Britain and Russia had independently devised metal-deposition processes similar to Brugnatelli's for the copper electroplating of printing press plates.

He was the first to adopt and make known in Italy the new theories and the new nomenclature introduced in chemistry by Antoine Lavoisier. He tried to introduce new concepts and new terminology (for example, instead of "lifeless" nitrogen he first proposed "light generator" and then "putrid" septone), but while these innovations gained some recognition even abroad they were ultimately not accepted.

In 1818, the year of his death, Brugnatelli was the first to prepare the compound alloxan, discovered by Justus von Liebig and Friedrich Wöhler.

An editorial entrepreneur, Brugnatelli played a very important role in stimulating scientific publications in Italy, helping to spread advanced knowledge of chemistry, physics and natural sciences. 

Luigi Valentino Brugnatelli died in his native Pavia in 1818 aged 57.

Publications

In addition to numerous minor works he wrote the following books and scientific journals: 
  Physical Library of Europe, 20 volumes, 1788 - 1791 
  Annals of Chemistry, 22 volumes 1790 - 1805 
  Physical-medical Journal, (in collaboration with Valeriano Luigi Brera ), 20 volumes, 1792 - 1796 
  Medical Commentaries (in collaboration with Valeriano Luigi Brera ), 3 volumes, 1797 
  Elements of Chemistry: supported by the most recent chemical and pharmaceutical discoveries (3 vols.), Pavia 1795-1798 
  Journal of Physics, Chemistry and Natural History, continued until after his death, 1808 - 1827 ; 
  Pharmacopoeia for use by apothecaries and modern doctors of the Italian Republic, Pavia 1802 , trad.  French: Pharmacopée générale , 2 volumes 1811 
  Elementary Treatise on General Chemistry (four editions: 1795 , 1801 , 1803 , 1810 ). 
  Human Litilogy or Chemical and Medical Research.  Posthumous work of Prof. LV Brugnatelli, published by Dr. Gaspare Brugnatelli.  Pavia 1819.

Editions

References

Bibliography
  U. Baldini, "Brugnatelli, Luigi Valentino", in Biographical Dictionary of Italians , vol.  14, Rome, 1972, pp. 494–496. 
  Luigi Valentino Brugnatelli, Travel Diary in Switzerland and France with Alessandro Volta in 1801 , edited by Alberto Gigli Berzolari, Bologna, Cisalpino, 1997 ("Sources and studies for the history of the University of Pavia" 28) -  
 A. Cattaneo, "Notes on the Life of LV Brugnatelli", Pharmacy Library - Chemistry - Physics - Medicine - Surgery - Therapeutic - Natural History, etc.  , Series 2, Volume 5 (January 1836), pp. III-XXIV 
  Francesco Selmi , Handbook of the art of gilding and silvering with electro-chemical methods and simple immersion, compiled by F. Selmi on the writings and works of Brugnatelli, Boquillon, etc.  , Reggio Emilia, 1844.

External links
  Valentino Brugnatelli, on Treccani.it - Online encyclopedias , Istituto dell'Enciclopedia Italiana . Modifica su Wikidata
  Luigi Valentino Brugnatelli, in Enciclopedia Italiana , Istituto dell'Enciclopedia Italiana . Modifica su Wikidata
  Valentino Brugnatelli, in Biographical Dictionary of Italians , Istituto dell'Enciclopedia Italiana . Modifica su Wikidata
  by Luigi Valentino Brugnatelli, on openMLOL , Horizons Unlimited srl. Modifica su Wikidata
  by Luigi Valentino Brugnatelli, on Open Library , Internet Archive . Modifica su Wikidata
  Museum of the History of the University of Pavia, on Musei.unipv.it.

1761 births
1818 deaths
Scientists from Pavia
Italian chemists
18th-century Italian scientists
19th-century Italian scientists
University of Pavia alumni
Academic staff of the University of Pavia